Kreher is a surname. Notable people with the surname include:

Kristy Sullivan (née Kreher, born 1980), American volleyball player
Louise Kreher, the co-founder of Louise Kreher Forest Ecology Preserve

See also
Kremer